The Wilson Building, also known as the Philip Wilson Building is a historic commercial building in downtown Carmel-by-the-Sea, California. It is an example of American Craftsman architectural style that was built in 1905 on the corner of Ocean Avenue and Dolores Street as a real estate office. In 1916 it became Carmel’s first official City Hall. The building qualified as an important building in the city's downtown historic district property survey and was recorded with the California Register of Historical Resources on November 30, 2002. The building is occupied by two tenants, the J. McLaughlin and The Agency.

History

The Wilson Building was established in 1905 by the Philip Wilson family as a real estate office during the pioneering days of Carmel-by-the-Sea, California. It is one of the oldest continually operating businesses in Carmel. The property is located on northwest corner of Ocean Avenue and Dolores Street. The building became a gathering place for locals, including writer Jimmy Hopper in 1906. 

The Wilson Building is a two-story, rectangular wood frame building with a pitched shingled roof with two dormers. The ground floor has the original corner entrance. A doorway was added to the north of the building. The south and east sides of the building have horizontal redwood siding. In 1923, an addition was added to the north side of the building.

The building served as Carmel's first "official" City Hall after its incorporation in 1916. A flagpole was erected on June 6, 1917. The monthly rent was $17.33. It was also the location of Carmel’s first police department.

In the 1990s, it was called the Burchell House Building. The Burchell House Properties (formerly Burchell Realty) held a grand opening of the restored property on October 1, 1999. The Burchell House Properties was a real-estate firm located in the upstairs office of the Wilson Building.

The building qualified for inclusion in the city's Downtown Historic District Property Survey, and was registered with the California Register of Historical Resources on September 7, 2004. The building qualifies under the California Register criterion 3 in architecture, as a good example of early Craftsman style built for a commercial building in Carmel.

Philip Wilson Jr.

Philip Wilson Jr. (1897-1959) was born in Ballinger, Texas on a cattle ranch. He moved to Carmel in 1905 with his family, one Carmel's' first residents. His parents were Scotsman Philip Wilson Sr. (1862-1944) and Laura May Pearce (1865-1962). His father was a rancher and his mother a public-school teacher. His mother was the sister of Mary Louise Pearce (1870-1952), who became Mrs. Dummage, wife of early plumber William T. Dummage (1854-1930) of Pacific Grove, California. See Mary Dummage Shop for details of her life. His sister, Grace Hood Wilson, married James H. Thorburn, who was the Carmel mayor from 1934-1936.

His parents purchased several parcels along Ocean Avenue and Dolores Street in 1905 and opened a real estate office (now the Philip Wilson Building) at the Northwest corner of Ocean and Dolores. They built their home in 1906 on San Carlos Street opposite the Sunset School. In 1912, they purchased a home at 14th Avenue and San Antonio Street from writer John Fleming Wilson where they lived for 43 years. His father developed the first and only Carmel Golf Course, which was located south of Carmel Beach on Point Loeb (now called Carmel Point) near the mouth of the Carmel River. It was the second course on the Monterey Peninsula. The nine holes golf course was sold when Wilson Sr., went to service during World War I and the land was subdivided into lots. The clubhouse became a one bedroom residence.

Wilson Jr. went to Monterey Union High School and served overseas in World War I. He acted in one of the first Forest Theater plays. In 1924, he entered the real estate business that was established in Carmel by his father. He later opened a second real estate office in Carmel Valley. He and his wife Marion Robinson Bryant (1894-1971), owned the White Oak Inn in Carmel Valley (the historic milk house). In 1949, Maarion made it into the Carmel Valley Art Gallery.

Wilson died on July 10, 1959, in Monterey, California due to a heart condition. Funeral services were held in the Little Chapel-by-the-Sea Crematorium. Rev. Don Johnson of the Carmel Valley Community Church officiated.

See also
 Wilson Building
 Carmel City Hall

References

External links

 Downtown Conservation District Historic Property Survey

1905 establishments in California
Carmel-by-the-Sea, California
Buildings and structures in Monterey County, California